John Forbes Benjamin (January 23, 1817 – March 8, 1877) was a U.S. Representative from Missouri.

Born in Cicero, New York, Benjamin attended the public schools.
He moved to Texas in 1845 and to Missouri in 1848.
He studied law.
He was admitted to the bar and commenced practice in Shelbyville, Missouri, in 1848.
He served as Democratic member of the Missouri House of Representatives 1850–1852.
He served as presidential elector on the Democratic ticket of in 1856.
He entered the Union Army as a private in 1861 and was subsequently promoted to the ranks of captain, major, lieutenant colonel, and brevet brigadier general.
Provost marshal of the Eighth District of Missouri in 1863 and 1864.
He served as delegate to the Republican National Convention in 1864.

Benjamin was elected as a Republican to the Thirty-ninth, Fortieth, and Forty-first Congresses (March 4, 1865 – March 4, 1871).
He served as chairman of the Committee on Invalid Expenditures (Forty-first Congress).
He was not a candidate for renomination in 1870.
He resumed the practice of law in Shelbyville.
He was an unsuccessful candidate for election in 1872 to the Forty-third Congress.
He moved to Washington, D.C., in 1874 and engaged in banking.
He died in Washington, D.C., March 8, 1877.
He was interred in a private cemetery at Shelbina, Missouri.

Benjamin is the namesake of the community of Benjamin, Missouri.

References

1817 births
1877 deaths
Union Army generals
Missouri Democrats
Members of the Missouri House of Representatives
Republican Party members of the United States House of Representatives from Missouri
1856 United States presidential electors
People from Cicero, New York
19th-century American politicians
People from Shelbyville, Missouri